The 2019 season was Geelong Football Club's first in the AFL Women's (AFLW) competition. Geelong (known as the Cats) joined the league as an expansion club alongside North Melbourne, having initially been denied entry into the competition's first season in 2017. Paul Hood was the club's inaugural senior coach, and Melissa Hickey was appointed club captain.

In preparation for the club's entry into the league, Geelong were provided with a range of recruitment concessions, including early access to existing clubs' players prior to the league's signing period, and additional selections in the 2018 AFL Women's draft. Nina Morrison was selected by the Cats with the first overall selection in the draft.

Geelong began the regular season against Collingwood at GMHBA Stadium on 2 February, finished the regular season with a 3–4 win–loss record, and qualified for the 2019 finals series. Geelong was subsequently defeated in a preliminary final against Adelaide by 66 points, eliminating them before the 2019 AFL Women's Grand Final.

Meg McDonald won Geelong's best and fairest award with 182 votes, finishing ahead of Olivia Purcell, who came in second place with 168 votes. McDonald was also the Cats' sole selection in the 2019 AFL Women's All-Australian team. Mia-Rae Clifford was the club's leading goalkicker, scoring six goals.

Background 

The first season of the AFL Women's (AFLW) league was held in 2017, and consisted of eight teams operated by associated clubs from the Australian Football League (AFL). Although Geelong Football Club's application to join the AFLW's inaugural season was unsuccessful, it was later confirmed in September 2017 that it would join the league as an expansion club from the 2019 season, alongside North Melbourne.

Paul Hood was appointed the club's inaugural AFLW coach in February 2018, having previously coached Geelong's VFL Women's (VFLW) team since its inception in 2016. Natalie Wood replaced Hood as the VFLW coach, and also secured a role as an assistant coach for the AFLW team. The coaching team was finalised in November 2018, with Geelong AFL players Tom Stewart and Aaron Black joining Wood as assistant coaches, and Oscar Owens and David Morgan named as development coaches.

Melissa Hickey was announced as the Cats' inaugural AFLW captain in December 2018. Rebecca Goring, who had captained the VFLW side since 2017, was awarded the role of vice-captain. The player leadership group for the 2019 season also consisted of Richelle Cranston, Renee Garing, Aasta O'Connor and Anna Teague.

Ford Australia and Deakin University were the major sponsors of the AFLW team for the 2019 season. Ford's partnership extended a long-running sponsorship deal that had existed since 1925 with the Geelong Football Club.

Playing list

Recruitment 

The playing list size of each AFLW team was set at 30 players for the 2019 season, with two of these players signed as "cross-code" rookies that had not participated in any Australian rules football competition during the previous three years.

In preparation for the clubs' entry into the league, both Geelong and North Melbourne were provided with a range of recruitment concessions. This included an exclusive ten-day signing period held in May 2018 where the two expansion clubs could recruit players from existing AFLW clubs. During this period Geelong signed: Richelle Cranston, Melissa Hickey, Erin Hoare and Anna Teague (from Melbourne); Aasta O'Connor (Western Bulldogs); Madeleine Boyd and Phoebe McWilliams (Greater Western Sydney). There was also the potential to sign players over the age of 18 who did not play in the AFLW in 2018, with the Cats recruiting six players from their VFLW team: Cassie Blakeway, Kate Darby, Renee Garing, Rebecca Goring, Jordan Ivey and Danielle Orr.

Due to the club only signing thirteen players during the expansion club signing period (compared to North Melbourne's seventeen players), Geelong was awarded four compensation selections in the upcoming draft—including the first two picks.

Following the expansion club signing period, all clubs could participate in a signing and trading period that ran from 23 May to 4 June 2018. Geelong were not heavily involved in trading with clubs, preferring to focus on building their list through their VFLW player signings.

The AFLW draft was held in October 2018, with the Cats selecting the final ten players of their inaugural list: Nina Morrison (pick 1), Sophie Van De Heuvel (2), Rebecca Webster (7), Olivia Purcell (14), Denby Taylor (20), Georgia Clarke (24), Rene Caris (35), Maighan Fogas (47), Elise Coventry (57) and Madeline Keryk (62).

Statistics 
Geelong utilised the majority of their playing list for this season, with only Elise Coventry and Hayley Trevean not appearing in an AFLW game. There were ten players who played in all eight of the club's games. Mia-Rae Clifford was the club's leading goalkicker, scoring six goals.

Season summary 

Due to the expansion in the number of teams participating in the AFLW competition, a conference system was introduced for the 2019 season. This involved two conferences ("Conference A" and "Conference B") consisting of five teams, with each team playing the other teams in their conference once—as well as three games against teams from the alternate conference. This equated to each team playing a total of seven matches in the regular season, with the two top teams in each conference qualifying for the finals series.

Geelong began the regular season against Collingwood at GMHBA Stadium, narrowly winning their first AFLW match by one point. Nina Morrison was nominated for the league's Rising Star award after accumulating 22 disposals and eight tackles and kicking the winning behind in a best-on-ground performance. This was to be Morrison's only game for the season, as she ruptured the anterior cruciate ligament (ACL) in her right knee at training the following week, which required a reconstruction. Geelong were defeated by reigning premiers Western Bulldogs in round two, recording an 18-point margin.

Captain Melissa Hickey missed the first two matches of the season due to injury, with vice-captain Rebecca Goring assuming the captain's role in Hickey's absence. Hickey played her first game for the Cats in round three, captaining a loss against Adelaide. Geelong won their next two matches, defeating Carlton and Brisbane to move to first position on the Conference B ladder after round five. Brisbane's score of 1.2 (8) was the lowest overall score in AFLW history at the time. Geelong played  in round six and despite leading after the first quarter, were defeated by 36 points after not scoring in the second half of the match. In the final round of the season, the Cats suffered a 31-point defeat by Greater Western Sydney, with a score of just 1.4 (10).

The club finished the regular season with a 3–4 win–loss record and placed second on the Conference B ladder, qualifying for the 2019 finals series. Geelong were subsequently defeated in a preliminary final against Adelaide by 66 points, and therefore did not progress to the 2019 AFL Women's Grand Final. Geelong's score of 1.1 (7) was the lowest overall score in AFLW history.

Results

Ladder

Awards 

Geelong's inaugural AFL Women's best and fairest was announced in a ceremony held at GMHBA Stadium on 5 April. The award was won by Meg McDonald, who received 182 votes; runner-up Olivia Purcell received 168 votes, with Renee Garing and Maddy McMahon in joint third place on 157 votes. Additionally, captain Melissa Hickey received the ‘Hoops’ award, for best representing the club's values, and Kate Darby was presented with the 'Community Champion' award.

McDonald and McMahon were both shortlisted for the honorary 2019 AFL Women's All-Australian team, however only McDonald was selected in the final team. Geelong also had two players, Nina Morrison (round one) and Purcell (round five), who were nominated for the season's Rising Star award.

VFLW Season 
In their third season in the second-tier VFL Women’s competition, AFLW coach Paul Hood stepped aside as Natalie Wood became the first female head coach in club history. Geelong appointed five players to a leadership group: Maddy Keryk, Amy McDonald, Danielle Higgins, Kate Darby, and Jordan Ivey sharing and rotating the captaincy responsibilities.

Making the finals from sixth position, the team was eliminated by Melbourne University in the first elimination final.

Results

Ladder

Awards 

 Best & Fairest: Rebecca Webster
 VFL Women’s Team of the Year: Rebecca Webster (Half back); Amy McDonald (Interchange)

See also 
2019 Geelong Football Club season

Notes

References

External links 
 Official website of the Geelong Football Club
 Official website of the AFL Women's

2019
Geelong Football Club